Johnny Mythen is an Irish Sinn Féin politician who has been a Teachta Dála (TD) for the Wexford constituency since the 2020 general election.

He is a former ESB worker and trade union representative. He was elected to Wexford County Council in 2014 for the Enniscorthy local electoral area, serving for five years before losing his seat. He previously contested the 2016 general election in the Wexford constituency, but narrowly missed out on the last seat by a margin of 52 votes. Mythen also contested the 2019 Wexford by-election, receiving 4,125 votes (10.3%) and being eliminated on the third count.

At the general election in February 2020, Mythen stood again in Wexford.  He won 24.9% of the first preference votes and was elected on the first count.

References

Year of birth missing (living people)
Living people
Irish trade unionists
Members of the 33rd Dáil
Sinn Féin TDs (post-1923)
Local councillors in County Wexford